In the geometry of hyperbolic 5-space, the 5-orthoplex honeycomb is one of five paracompact regular space-filling tessellations (or honeycombs). It is called paracompact because it has infinite vertex figures, with all vertices as ideal points at infinity.  With Schläfli symbol {3,3,3,4,3}, it has three 5-orthoplexes around each cell. It is dual to the 24-cell honeycomb honeycomb.

Related honeycombs
It is related to the regular Euclidean 4-space 16-cell honeycomb, {3,3,4,3}, with 16-cell (4-orthoplex) facets, and the regular 4-polytope 24-cell, {3,4,3} with octahedral (3-orthoplex) cell, and cube {4,3}, with (2-orthoplex) square faces.

See also 
 List of regular polytopes

References 
Coxeter, Regular Polytopes, 3rd. ed., Dover Publications, 1973. . (Tables I and II: Regular polytopes and honeycombs, pp. 294–296)
Coxeter, The Beauty of Geometry: Twelve Essays, Dover Publications, 1999  (Chapter 10: Regular honeycombs in hyperbolic space, Summary tables II,III,IV,V, p212-213)

Honeycombs (geometry)